Kangan County is in Bushehr province, Iran. The capital of the county is the city of Bandar Kangan. At the 2006 census, the county's population was 95,113 in 15,220 households. The following census in 2011 counted 170,774 people in 25,667 households. At the 2016 census, the county's population was 107,801 in 27,873 households, by which time Asaluyeh District had been separated from the county to form Asaluyeh County.

Administrative divisions

The population history and structural changes of Kangan County's administrative divisions over three consecutive censuses are shown in the following table. The latest census shows one district, two rural districts, and three cities.

References

 

Counties of Bushehr Province